2017 Kataller Toyama season.

J3 League

References

External links
 J.League official site

Kataller Toyama
Kataller Toyama seasons